The Women's 3 metre springboard competition at the 1973 World Aquatics Championships was held on 2 and 3 September 1973.

Results
Green denotes finalists

References
Official Results

Women's 3 metre springboard